Piyarat Lajungreed (born September 18, 1991), simply known as Sun is a Thai professional footballer who plays as a left back for Thai League T1 club Sukhothai.

Club career

External links
 

1991 births
Living people
Piyarat Lajungreed
Piyarat Lajungreed
Association football defenders
Piyarat Lajungreed
Piyarat Lajungreed
Piyarat Lajungreed
Piyarat Lajungreed
Piyarat Lajungreed
Piyarat Lajungreed
Piyarat Lajungreed
Piyarat Lajungreed
Piyarat Lajungreed